Özlem is a common feminine Turkish given name. In Turkish, "Özlem" means yearning and missing.

Given name
 Asiye-Özlem Sahin (born 1976), Turkish-German professional boxer
 Dilara Özlem Sucuoğlu (born 1998), Turkish-German footballer
 Fatma Özlem Tursun (born 1988), Turkish female football referee and former women's footballer
 Özlem Araç (born 1989), Turkish football manager and former women's football player
 Özlem Başyurt (born 1971), Turkish basketball coach and teacher, former footballer and basketball player
 Özlem Becerikli (born 1980), Turkish bronze medalist Paralympian powerlifter
 Özlem Ceren Dursun (born 2003), Turkish cross-country skier
 Özlem Çarıkçıoğlu (born 1994), Turkish Olympian alpine skier
 Özlem Çekiç (born 1976), Danish politician of Turkish origin
 Özlem Conker (born 1973), Turkish actress
 Özlem Denizmen, Turkish businesswoman
 Özlem Kaya (athlete) (born 1990), Turkish middle distance runner
 Özlem Kaya (swimmer) (born 1992), Turkish Para swimmer
 Özlem Kolat (born 1984), Turkish clarinetist
 Özlem Özçelik (born 1972), Turkish volleyball player
 Özlem Tekin (born 1971), Turkish singer
Özlem Türeci, Turkish-German scientist, wife of Uğur Şahin founder & CEO of Biontech
 Özlem Türköne (born 1976), Turkish columnist and politician 
 Özlem Yalman (born 1977), Turkish basketball referee
 Özlem Yasemin Taşkın (born 1985), retired Turkish swimmer
 Özlem Zengin (born 1969), Turkish lawyer

Surname
 Yılmaz Özlem (born 1972), Turkish footballer

Turkish feminine given names